René Primevère Lesson  publishes Manuel d'Ornithologie 
Justin Goudot began collecting bird skins for the Paris museum which held what was then world's largest bird collection .
Death of Thomas Bewick
Death of Carl Peter Thunberg
Magnus and Wilhelm von Wright begin the illustrative work Svenska Foglar (Swedish birds). Completion takes 10 years.
Carl Friedrich Bruch proposes a system of trinomial nomenclature for species. 
Salomon Müller collects bird specimens for Coenraad Jacob Temminck on the island of Timor 
Christian Gottfried Ehrenberg and  Wilhelm Hemprich describe the greater blue-eared glossy-starling and the  rosy-patched bushshrike  in Symbolae Physicae 
Phillip Parker King describes the imperial shag, the bronze-winged duck, the austral pygmy owl, the Patagonian crested duck, the Magellanic woodpecker, the rufous-legged owl and the austral rail. 
Sarah Countess Amherst, wife of William Pitt Amherst, Governor General of Bengal, sends the first specimen of Lady Amherst's pheasant to London.

Ongoing events 
Coenraad Jacob Temminck Nouveau recueil de planches coloriées d'oiseaux Birds first described in this work in 1828 include the black-browed albatross, the comb-crested jacana and the tawny eagle

Birding and ornithology by year
1828 in science